André Marquis (24 October 1883 – 15 October 1957) was a French Vichyist admiral, famous for the  scuttling of the French fleet in Toulon.

He was captured by the Germans in the wake of their attempt to capture the French fleet, but his assistant managed to warn other officers and transmit the order to scuttle the fleet.

At the Liberation, he was tried for treason, failure to save his fleet, and failing to deliver his fleet to the Allies, and indignité nationale.

French military personnel of World War II
French Navy admirals
1883 births
1957 deaths